The Entrance Band (formerly called Entrance) is a band started by Guy Blakeslee (born April 29, 1981). Their style of music has been described as psychedelic rock or stoner rock.

Blakeslee was born and raised in Baltimore, Maryland and first gained notice as a member of The Convocation Of.... He later left the band and moved to Chicago to pursue a solo career under the guise of the name Entrance. He performed regularly for the next 18 months at a bar called The Hideout, which eventually gained him the attention of Tiger Style Records.

Entrance toured with Sonic Youth, Devendra Banhart, Will Oldham, Stephen Malkmus and the Jicks, Yeah Yeah Yeahs, Dungen and Cat Power. Blakeslee has released his music through Tiger Style Records and Fat Possum Records, as well through his own record label, Entrance Records. The Entrance Band were chosen by Animal Collective to perform at the All Tomorrow's Parties festival that they curated in May 2011.

Band members
Guy Blakeslee
Paz Lenchantin
Derek James

Discography

Albums
The Kingdom of Heaven Must be Taken by Storm (2003) - Tiger Style Records
Wandering Stranger (2004) - Fat Possum Records
Prayer of Death (2006) - Entrance Records. Tee Pee Records
The Entrance Band (2009) - Ecstatic Peace
Face The Sun (2013) - Beyond Beyond is Beyond Records
Book of Changes (2017) - Thrill Jockey

EPs
Honey Moan (2003) - Tiger Style Records in United States/Careless Love (2003) - Sketchbook Records in UK & Europe.
Latitudes (2012) - Latitudes
Fine Flow (2012) - Spiritual Pajamas
Dans La Tempeta (2013) - Spiritual Pajamas

Singles
"See for Yourself" (2002) split 7-inch w/ Papa M - Tiger Style Records.
"I Want You" b/w "A House is Not A Motel" (2011) - Black Tent Press
"Not Gonna Say Your Name" (2017) - Self-released

References

External links

Myspace
Bandcamp

1981 births
Living people
American rock guitarists
American male guitarists
American rock singers
Fat Possum Records artists
Musicians from Baltimore
Singers from Maryland
Guitarists from Maryland
21st-century American singers
21st-century American guitarists
21st-century American male singers
Universal Motown Records artists